The Ford GAA engine is an American all-aluminum 32-valve DOHC 60-degree liquid-cooled V8 internal combustion engine with a flat-plane crank designed and produced by the Ford Motor Company before and during World War II. It features twin Stromberg NA-Y5-G carburetors, dual magnetos and twin spark plugs making up a full dual ignition system, and crossflow induction.

The GAA powered several models and derivatives of the M4A3 Sherman medium tank.

Development
Immediately preceding World War II, Ford developed an aircraft engine similar to the Rolls-Royce Merlin. It was a 60 degree V-12 of 1,650 cubic inch displacement with cylinder bore and stroke matching the Merlin aviation engine, using an aluminum block and head; dual overhead camshafts, and four valves per cylinder. The intention of this design was to help Ford break into the anticipated large market for aircraft engines. This engine was built to typical aircraft standards: it was light, high performance, and highly reliable. Everything was safety wired or staked with close attention to detail on every part. Available information suggests this design performed well.

However, it never went into production as an aircraft engine due to the United States Navy's decision to only use radial engines for its aircraft and the Army's contractual commitments to existing manufacturers.

With the approach of war, increasing orders for M4 Sherman tanks were causing supply issues with the 9-cylinder radial Wright R-975 Whirlwind engine used. The U.S. Army decided it needed to source additional engine suppliers, choosing a version of the Ford GAA cut down from twelve cylinders to eight for various vehicle applications.

In 1942 after the British Tank Mission visit to America in April, there was some pressure from British car and commercial vehicle manufacturers to use the new Ford V8 tank engine designed by Larry Sheldrick in British tanks, rather than the  Meteor then under development by Rolls-Royce from the Merlin aero engine, as they believed that an adapted aero engine "would not be suitable as a rugged tank engine". The Ford engine prototype had a few hundred hours test-bed running by that time. It was a liquid-cooled Vee similar to the Meteor, but two-third the size and Robotham doubted its reliability at 600 bhp. The 600 bhp Meteor was designed to fit in the same space in the Crusader (tank) as the Nuffield Liberty L-12 engine of 340 bhp output. The Ford V8 developed only 500 bhp, and had problems which were not overcome until after the Normandy landings in 1944.

Production 

 The GAA was used in the M4A3 (1,690), M4A3(75)W (3,071), M4A3(76)W (1,400), M4A3 (105) (500), M4A3E2 (254), M4A3(76)W HVSS (3,142), M4A3(105) HVSS (2,539), M10A1 (1,413), and M7B1 (826).
 The GAF powered the M26 (2,222), M26A1, T28/T95 (2), and M45 (185).
 The GAN powered the T23 (248) and M4A3E2 (254).
 In order to meet the need for a larger engine, Ford resurrected the V-12 version as the GAC, which produced  and powered the T29, and T32 (6).
A number of M74 tank recovery vehicles were rebuilt from M4A3s, which used the GAA.

See also
 List of Ford engines
 History of the tank
 Rolls-Royce Meteor
 Rolls-Royce Meteorite

Notes

References 
Berndt, Thomas. Standard Catalog of U.S. Military Vehicles. Iola, WI:  Krause Publications, 1993. .
 Aircraft Engine Historical Society.Aircraft Engines in Armored Vehicles
Hunnicutt, R. P. Firepower: A History of the American Heavy Tank. Novato, California: Presidio Press, 1988.

External links
 https://www.youtube.com/watch?v=W2ghTjFtNPo engine running

GAA
Tank engines
V8 engines
Gasoline engines by model
M4 Sherman tanks